Methylobacterium oryzae  is a facultatively methylotrophic and aerobic bacteria from the genus of Methylobacterium which has been isolated from tissues of the rice plant Oryza sativa in Cheongwon in Korea. Methylobacterium oryzae can utilize 1-aminocyclopropane 1-carboxylate. Methylobacterium oryzae can promote plant growth.

References

Further reading

External links
Type strain of Methylobacterium oryzae at BacDive -  the Bacterial Diversity Metadatabase

Hyphomicrobiales
Bacteria described in 2007